Sanos (Macedonian: Санос) is a company from Skopje, North Macedonia, which produces urban, suburban and intercity buses, airport buses and special vehicles.

The factory was established in 1946 as a Yugoslav state factory under the name FAS "11. Oktobar" AD Skopje, although the roots of the plant date back to 1930 when the factory was a workshop for repair and production with more than 30 workers. In 1967, the then Sanos Bus Factory started cooperation with a Yugoslav producer, as a result of which 15 prototype Sanos A9 models were created in Poland in Sanos A9. Under the brand Sanos, the factory had produced all types of buses, medium buses, vehicles, special vehicles, airport buses and subcontracting successfully lasted until 2001, when production was temporarily halted.

In April 2004, the company Unitires bought the factory due to their experience in the production of auto-moto industry, the factory was quickly restarted under the new name for the Bus Factory and Vehicles, FAS Sanos and production was restored and modernized scoring quality that falls within the world standards in the production of buses and vehicles.

Capacity 
The maximum capacity of the factory is 1500 buses annually.

Products

Sources

References

Bus manufacturers of North Macedonia
Bus_manufacturers_of_Yugoslavia
Vehicle manufacturing companies established in 1946
Brands of North Macedonia
1946 establishments in Yugoslavia
Companies based in Skopje